In tennis, reigning champion Molla Bjurstedt won the singles tennis title of the 1916 U.S. Women's National Singles Championship by defeating Louise Hammond Raymond 6–0, 6–1 in the challenge round. Hammond Raymond had won the right to challenge Bjurstedt by defeating Eleanora Sears 6–3, 6–4 in the final of the All Comers' competition. The event was played on outdoor grass courts and held at the Philadelphia Cricket Club in Wissahickon Heights, Chestnut Hill, Philadelphia in the United States, from June 5 through June 12, 1916.

Draw

Challenge round

All Comers' finals

References

1916 in women's tennis
1916
June 1916 sports events
1916 in American women's sports
Women's Singles
Chestnut Hill, Philadelphia
1910s in Philadelphia
1916 in sports in Pennsylvania
Women's sports in Pennsylvania